Inexus is a Cardiff-based provider of utility infrastructure services to mainly new-build construction sites within the United Kingdom. Operating within a series of sub-brands, the company plans and manages the installation of electrical, gas, water and telecommunications supplies, acting as an interface between developers and both the utility service companies and infrastructure providers.

Formerly a subsidiary of French oil group Total S.A., in September 2005 the company was acquired by Australian private equity company, the Challenger Infrastructure Fund (CIF), for an enterprise value of £465m. In 2011, it was listed on the 100 most profitable private equity held companies in the UK, with profits of £43.4m in 2010. On 19 October 2012, Brookfield Infrastructure Partners has agreed to buy Inexus and merge it with GTC Group, with a £900 million refinancing of the new entity.

Inexus Group companies include:
Connect Utilities Ltd
Envoy Asset Management Ltd
Metropolitan Infrastructure Ltd
Independent Water Networks Ltd
Independent Fibre Networks Ltd
Exoteric Holdings Ltd
Independent Pipelines Ltd
Independent Power Networks Ltd
Independent Meters Ltd
Inexus Services Ltd

References

External links
Group website

Companies based in Cardiff
Privately held companies of the United Kingdom
Utilities of the United Kingdom
Service companies of the United Kingdom
Energy in Wales
TotalEnergies